Kashirsky (masculine), Kashirskaya (feminine), or Kashirskoye (neuter) is the name of several rural localities in Russia:
Kashirskoye, Kaliningrad Oblast, a settlement in Khrabrovsky Rural Okrug of Guryevsky District of Kaliningrad Oblast
Kashirskoye, Voronezh Oblast, a selo in Kashirskoye Rural Settlement of Kashirsky District of Voronezh Oblast